This is a list of space forces, units, and formations that identifies the current and historical antecedents and insignia for the military space arms of countries fielding a space component, whether an independent space force, multinational commands, joint command, or as a part of another military service.

Independent space forces

|rowspan="2"| 

|rowspan="19"| 

|}

Air and space forces

|rowspan="2"| 

|| 

|rowspan="13"|  (1992–present) (1991–1992) (1955–1991)

|rowspan="1"| 

|}

Joint and multinational space commands

|rowspan="2"| 

|| 

|| 

|| 

|rowspan="2"| 

|| 

|| 

|| 

|rowspan="3"|

|rowspan="9"| 

|}

Service space units and formations 

|| 

|| 

|| 

|rowspan="3"| 

|| 

|| 

|| 

|| 

|| 

|| 

|rowspan="2"| 

|rowspan="38"| 

|}

See also
 List of air forces
 List of armies by country
 List of militaries by country
 List of navies
 Ranks and insignia of space forces

Notes

References

Space
Space
.Space forces
Space warfare
Lists of space agencies